Jesper Thörnberg (born March 15, 1991) is a Swedish professional ice hockey player who is currently playing with the Odense Bulldogs in the Metal Ligaen (DEN).

Thörnberg made his Elitserien debut during the 2010–11 season.  Jesper is the younger brother of Martin Thörnberg who played extensively with HV71.

Career statistics

Regular season and playoffs

International

References

External links

1991 births
Living people
IF Björklöven players
Herlev Eagles players
HV71 players
HC TWK Innsbruck players
Odense Bulldogs players
Södertälje SK players
Swedish ice hockey left wingers
IF Troja/Ljungby players
Sportspeople from Jönköping